Jaipur City Transport Services Limited (JCTSL) is a city bus service for Jaipur, the capital of Rajasthan state in India. It is operated by RSRTC. The system has been running from many years, but was heavily modified in 2007. RSRTC extended travelling facility to the colonies and sub-urban towns in and around Jaipur. Regardless of the heavy financial loss on the system, RSRTC has been operating about 300 city buses per day. For late night passengers, selected city night service buses connecting to the local railway station and the  Bus Stand have also been operated by RSRTC. Recently it also inaugurated its HOP-ON HOP-OFF service for attracting foreign tourists.  The process of development and expansion of the system to the commuters is a regular process in RSRTC and RSRTC is expediting its responsibility. For declaring its public responsibility, Jaipur City Transport Services has been published for better transparency and accountability.

History

City bus service was introduced in 2007. Initially, 100 buses were used. The new city bus was very well received by the local populace, and it became very popular. In 2009, a new fleet of low floor and low floor AC buses were introduced. It is run under the Jawaharlal Nehru National Urban Renewal Mission (JNNURM). Bus service was initially only on the main roads, but it later operated in residential areas too. Now it also operates in congested areas. JCTSL was established to cater the increasing needs of Jaipur City.RSRTC covered travelling facility to the colonies, urban, sub-urban town, historical places, and tourist places and around Jaipur.

Organization

JCTSL is headquartered at Jaipur and has 15 primary routes. It has 4 depots: Sanganer, Vidhyadhar Nagar, Shastri Nagar, and Bais Godam. Jaipur City Transport Services employs 650 employees.[1]

Fleet

It has a fleet of 400 buses. JCTSL and RSRTC Jaipur runs city bus service. Of them, 20 are A/C Low floor, 380 are non A/C Low floor. At present there are 7 radial routes with 7 additional routes, 3 circular routes,3 AC routes and 6 sub-urban routes. Buses in green colour are for suburban and rural services in and around Jaipur city.

Low floor bus service
Jaipur city transport services limited operates a large number of A/C and non A/C low floor buses under the title RSRTC JNNURM. The type of bus can be judged on their colour. The A/C buses are in dark red, while the routes have their own colors. These buses are well designed and equipped with all needed security measures, though security measures are rarely followed by commuters. These buses can be used by the physically disabled.  Modern automatic door opening/closing function is there in this buses.

Suburban bus service
Jaipur city transport services limited operates buses for suburban towns around Jaipur. These buses are green in color and have limited stops as compared to City buses. They have fixed fares and are very good source of transportation for neighboring towns around Jaipur.

Mini bus service
The Jaipur City Transport Services Limited (JCTSL) operates a fleet of low-floor buses in the Walled city area in December. These have replaced the old big buses which the traffic police had declared unsuitable for commute in the congested area. These buses run on two-three routes covering majority of the Walled City area. The places which were not connected with the bus service in the past, is covered by the new fleet. These buses will have a capacity to accommodate 30 passengers which can go up to a maximum of 35. The buses are also going to provide a relief to the traffic police which has been facing a tough time in managing the vehicular movement at peak hours. "Driving during peak hours has become a time-consuming task. It is a good move to replace the big low-floor buses," said Devendra Jain, a shopkeeper in the Walled City area.

Passenger amenities
To solve the transportation problems of Jaipur, new buses were introduced recently by JCTSL. Millions of passengers with a view to facilitate the city (JCTSL) take the floor on Thursday, 10 bus routes "Jaipur just" the pilot began.

Proposed plans

The BQS are an integral of the overall transportation plan. All JCTSL buses running on any of the routes will stop only at the BQS. The BQS is designed so as to facilitate boarding and disembarking from the special JnNURM buses. The BQS is also expected to act as information centres for passengers, tourists and others and have been specially designed for high density areas at the points of easy accessibility. Each BQS is expected to have a small kiosk as well as an ATM counter. Since it is prominently located on the roadside, well lit in the evenings, the BQS will also serve as one of the best advertisement platforms for visual advertising in Jaipur city. As a policy measure too, the governments are increasingly adopting advertisement by-laws which clearly indicate that advertisement on roads have to be in/near the public transport facilities. Apart from the utility, the BQS are also expected to be, visually, very attractive.

References

External links

Transport in Jaipur
Companies based in Rajasthan
Economy of Jaipur
Metropolitan transport agencies of India
Year of establishment missing